NBA Street Homecourt is the fourth game in the NBA Street series. It was released for the Xbox 360 on February 20, 2007, and for the PlayStation 3 on March 6, 2007.

Carmelo Anthony, pictured during his tenure with the Denver Nuggets, is featured on the cover.

A demo of the game was released on February 2, 2007 on the Xbox Live Marketplace and PlayStation Store. NBA Street Homecourt was the first Xbox 360 game to be natively rendered in the 1080p resolution. The game features basketball courts that are based on real ones that NBA superstars grew up on and honed their talents.

Reception

The game was met with positive reception.  GameRankings and Metacritic gave it a score of 82% and 80 out of 100 respectively for the Xbox 360 version; and 82% and 81 out of 100 for the PS3 version.

The A.V. Club gave the game an A, saying, "A dazzling array of showmanship, visual glitz, and a hefty dose of fun make this an absolute must-play." The New York Times gave it a favorable review and said that the game "may bear only a passing resemblance to real basketball, but it is tremendous fun, even if you never have to the pass the game controller behind your back or toss it in the air." Detroit Free Press gave it three stars out of four and stated that "the high-flying super dunks, crazy-killer crossovers and behind-the-back, no-look and kick passes are exaggerated to new heights. And here lies one of the game's biggest pluses."

References

External links

2007 video games
Electronic Arts games
National Basketball Association video games
Homecourt
PlayStation 3 games
Video games developed in Canada
Xbox 360 games
EA Sports Big games